The House of Golitsyn or Galitzine was one of the largest princely of the noble houses in the Tsardom of Russia and Russian Empire. Among them were boyars, warlords, diplomats, generals (the Mikhailovichs), stewards, chamberlains, the richest men of Russia (the Alexeyevichs), and provincial landlords (the Vasilyevichs). Since 1694 Bolshiye Vyazyomy was one of the ancestral estates of the Golitsyns, but many others, like Arkhangelskoye Palace and Dubrovitsy near Podolsk, were owned by different branches or members of the family.

In the 1850s the Russian memoirist Filipp Vigel despaired: "So numerous are the Golitsyns that soon it will be impossible to mention any of them without the family tree at hand". Of the numerous branches of the princely family that existed in 1917, only one survived in the Soviet Union; all others were extinguished or forced into exile. The Bolsheviks arrested dozens of Golitsyns only to be shot or killed in the Gulag; dozens disappeared in the storm of the revolution and the Russian Civil War, and their fate remained unknown.

Origins

The family descends according to legend from a Lithuanian prince Jurgis (George), son of Patrikas and grandson of Narimantas, thus great-grandson of Gediminas (d. 1341), Grand Duke of Lithuania. After the extinction of the Korecki family in the 17th century, the Golitsyns claimed dynastic seniority in the House of Gediminas.

History 

George immigrated to the court of Vasily I of Moscow and married Vasily's sister. His children and grandchildren, among them Vassian Patrikeyev, were considered premier Russian boyars. One of them, Prince Mikhail Ivanovich Bulgark (The Bulgarian), earned the nickname Golitsa (glove,  in Old Lithuanian) for an iron (or strong leather) glove he wore in the Battle of Orsha in 1514. His son Yuri Mikhailovich Bulgakov continued with the family line Golytsin and his great-grandson Prince Vasily Golitsyn was claimant to the Russian throne during the Time of Troubles and went as an ambassador to Poland to offer the Russian crown to Prince Władysław; died in prison.

Prince (knyaz) Andrey Andreyevich Golitsyn (d. 1638), governor of Siberia (1633–35), was the ancestor of all existing princes Golitsyns. He had four sons, from whom four branches of the Golitsyn family descended:
Vasil (1618–1652) – branch Vassilyevich
Ivan (? – 1690) – branch Ivanovich, ended in 1751 (in a monastery)
Alexey (1632–1694) – branch Alexeevich
Michael (1639–1687) – branch Mikhailovich

The family produced many well-known statesmen and generals, among them Vasily, Boris, Dmitry and Nikolai Golitsyn, the last chairman of the Council of Ministers of the Russian Empire (Prime Minister of Imperial Russia), earning his living by repairing shoes and guarding public parks after the February revolution.

Notable Golitsyns 

 

Branch Vassilyevich
  Vasily Vasilyevich Golitsyn (1643–1714) was a leading boyar, a Russian statesman, combining military duties with civilian pursuits, de facto head of the government during the regency of Sophia Alekseyevna (1682–1689) over her brother Ivan and half-brother Peter the Great who banished him and his family to Arkhangelsk Oblast. He owned a richly decorated mansion in Moscow which became the location of the State Duma.
 Aleksey Vasilyevich Golitsyn (1665–1740) In 1683, he received from his grandfather a village south of Moscow, now Tsaritsyno Palace and surrounding park. In 1694 he was stripped of his boyardom (with the retention of the princely title) and the Tsar sent him and his family into exile. He returned in 1726, after the death of Peter I. 
 Mikhail Alekseyevich Golitsyn (1687–1775) nicknamed "the fool" was punished by Empress Anna of Russia for converting to Catholicism in order to marry an Italian or German woman. This marriage was declared illegal and she appointed him court jester in 1738, serving kvass to the guests. Two years later she forced him to marry either a Kalmuck or a female jester from Kamchatka. The "mock wedding" which took place inside a two-room ice palace on the Neva in February 1740 during an extremely cold winter remained famous. He moved to his estate and was buried near Pushkino.
 Sergei Alekseyevich Golitsyn (1695–1758), served as the Moscow governor, director of the Moscow Mint. 
 Nikolai Sergeyevich Golitsyn (1712–1773)
 Alexander Nikolayevich Golitsyn (1773–1844), was a lifelong bachelor, homosexual and reactionary minister of education in the government of Alexander I. He headed an investigation into masonic involvement in the Decembrist uprising of 1825 and served as the Chairman of the State Council from 1838 to 1841; retired to his Crimean estate in Neo-Gothic style.
Aleksey Sergeyevich Golitsyn (1723–1765) was the grandfather of Nikolai Dmitriyevich Golitsyn, the last prime minister of Imperial Russia.

Branch Alexeevich
 Aleksey Andreyevich Golitsyn (1632–1694), governor of Siberia, of Kiev.
 Boris Alekseyevich Golitsyn (1654–1714), a cousin and the chief political opponent of Vasily Vasilyevich, was tutor and participated in the coup that placed Peter the Great on the throne; head of the government during the "Great Embassy" of 1697–98; owner of the estates Bolshiye Vyazyomy and Dubrovitsy. 
 Vasili Borisovich Golitsyn (1681–1710) inherited the estate, but died when the ceiling came down.
 Mikhail Vasilievich Golitsyn (1702–1749)
 Nikolay Mikhailovich Golitsyn (1729–1799) became the new owner of Bolshiye Vyazyomy in 1766.  
 Boris Vasilievich Golitsyn (1705–1769), admiral
 Vladimir Borisovich Golitsyn (1731–1798) was a Russian statesman; his wife Natalya Golitsyna was known as a learned woman, a gambler and a good dancer. She served Catherine the Great and was characterized in The Queen of Spades (story). In 1783 she moved with her daughters Ekaterina and Sophie to Paris and visited her sons; all the Golitsyns returned to Russia in 1791.
 Boris Vladimirovich Golitsyn (1769–1813) was a Russian aristocrat who received his education in Strasbourg (1782), and attended the École militaire in Paris (1786). The correspondence of the elder of the Golitsyn brothers attests to his deep interest in analyzing and comprehending the events of the French Revolution. He became very hostile to the turn of events and joined the Swedish army to fight against Revolutionary France. In 1803, Boris Vladimirovich received the estate of Vyazemy from Nikolai Mikhailovich Golitsyn (1729–1799), interested in agriculture, horse breeding, but without issue. Boris fought in the battle of Smolensk, was wounded in the battle of Borodino and died in Vilnius.
 Dmitri Vladimirovich Golitsyn (1771–1844) attended the École Militair also, which Napoleon had left in 1785. On 14 July 1789 Dmitry was somehow involved in the Storming of the Bastille. He wrote his mother about the activities of the National Constituent Assembly (France). After a brief participation in the Finnish War Dmitry resigned his commission in 1809 and settled at Bolshiye Vyazyomy. At the end of August 1812 he was reappointed by Kutuzov. After the Battle of Borodino both Kutuzov and Napoleon spend a night on his estate along the road from Mozhaysk to Moscow. He fought in the Battle of Tarutino, Vyazma, and Krasny.  In 1814 he was promoted to the rank of full General of the Cavalry. He governed Moscow for 25 years, but died in Paris. Member of the State Council (Russian Empire).
 Vladimir Dmitrievich Golitsyn (1815–1888) married Maria Golitzyna.
 Ivan Alekseyevich Golitsyn (1656/8–1729)
 Alexei Ivanovich Golitsyn (1707–1739) died of plague in Constantinople.
 Ivan Alekseyevich Golitsyn (1729–1767)
 Pyotr Alekseyevich Golitsyn (1731–1810)
 Dmitri Alekseyevich Gallitzin (1734/8–The Hague, 1803) was a Russian diplomat, art agent for Catherine the Great. The idea of acquiring not individual pictures but large collections "en bloc" came from Golitsyn. He was the main driving force behind the subsequent painting acquisitions in France. He was the Russian ambassador in Paris (1762–68); a friend of Falconet, Denis Diderot, a supporter of the physiocrats, and translated Helvétius. He was envoy in The Hague (1768–98), a supporter of the League of Armed Neutrality, the recognition of the United States and the abolition of serfdom. After 1789 he continued to defend his principles and never returned to Russia. In 1768 he married Adelheid Amalie Gallitzin. In 1774 the couple split and the Princess moved to a country house between The Hague and the beach, to better to oversee raising her children in a way J.J. Rousseau had promoted in his "Emile". She turned to Catholicism in 1786. He is known as volcanologist and mineralogist. 
 Prince Demetrius Augustine Gallitzin (The Hague, 1770–1840) also known as the Apostle of the Alleghenies, grew up with prince William I of the Netherlands. In 1792 he embarked to Baltimore. He was the first Roman Catholic priest ordained in America; a settlement in Pennsylvania is named after him. He is currently under investigation for possible Sainthood, his current title is Servant of God.
 Pyotr Alekseyevich Golitsyn (1660–1722)

Branch Mikhailovich
Mikhail Andreyevich Golitsyn (1639–1687) was governor of Smolensk, Kiev and Kursk.
 Dmitry Mikhailovich Golitsyn the Elder (1665–1737) opposed Peter's reforms. In 1727 he became a member of the Supreme Privy Council, which governed for Peter II of Russia. He was condemned to death (1736) for his anti-autocratic beliefs, but Anna of Russia commuted his sentence to life imprisonment. Noted for his attempt to turn Russia into a constitutional monarchy; Russia lived without autocracy for only 37 days. Owner of Arkhangelskoye Palace.
 Mikhail Mikhailovich Golitsyn (Field Marshal) (Sr) (1675–1730) is best known for his governorship of Old Finland (1714–1721), where his harsh rule is remembered by the people he had conquered as the Greater Wrath (Swedish: Stora ofreden); member of the Supreme Privy Council. He was married twice and had 18 children.
 Alexander Mikhailovich Golitsyn (1718–1783) was field-marshal wounded at the Battle of Kunersdorf, an envoy in Hamburg, Constantinople, ambassador in Dresden, and governor of Saint Petersburg, involved in the development of New Holland Island.
 Dmitry Mikhailovich Golitsyn the Younger (1721–1793) was the Russian ambassador in Vienna. He married Ekaterina, a daughter of the Moldovan historian and composer Dimitrie Cantemir, and was the brother-in-law of Antiochus Cantemir. Primarily remembered for the  he funded, he was also an art collector, advised Catherine the Great. He was a patron of Mozart, whom he invited to play once a week.
 Nikolai Mikhailovich Golitsyn (1727–1787)
 Andrey Mikhailovich Golitsyn (1729–1770)
 Boris Andreevich Golitsyn (1766–1822) was a Russian general but was dismissed in 1800. He was friendly with  Pyotr Bagration who died of gangrene on his estate at Sima, Vladimir Oblast. Boris joined the Napoleonic wars afterwards. 
 Prince Nikolai Borisovich Galitzin (1794–1866) was an amateur cellist who commissioned Beethoven in 1822 to write his last string quartets, sometimes called the Galitzin quartets. He translated Pushkin's works into French and sent his translations to the author, with whom he was probably familiar since the late 1810s. 
 Mikhail Mikhailovich Golitsyn (admiral) (Jr) (1684–1764) was general admiral of the Russian fleet (1756); member of the Supreme Privy Council. 
 Alexander Mikhailovich Golitsyn (vice chancellor) (1723–1807) was a Russian envoy to Paris, and London. He contributed to the accession to the throne of Catherine II of Russia. In 1778, he retired and lived in Moscow, doing charitable work. He was the founder of the Golitsyn Hospital, and at the expense of his cousin D.M. Golitsyn. He was buried in the church of the Golitsyn Hospital, now the City Clinical Hospital No. 1. 
 Andrei Mikhailovich Golitsyn (1729–1770) married a daughter of Boris Grigoryevich Yusupov.
 Alexey Andreevich Golitsyn (1767–1800) married Alexandra Petrovna Golitsyna
 Pyotr Alexeyevich Golitsyn (1792–1842)  a Catholic convert who moved to Paris
 Princess Yelizaveta Alexeyevna Golitsyna (1797–1844) a Roman Catholic nun
 Mikhail Mikhailovich Golitsyn (1731–1804) was married to the wealthy Anna Alexandrovna Stroganova (1739–1816), who brought the estate Vlakhernskoye-Kuzminki as a dowry. 
Alexander Mikhailovich Golitsyn (1772–1821) was an art collector.
Mikhail Alexandrovich Golitsyn (1804–1860) was diplomat, writer and connoisseur of fine arts, who lived in Madrid and Rome, and turned catholic. He was a bibliophile and the owner of a splendid library.
Sergey Mikhailovich (1843–1915) opened the Golitsyn Museum, now part of the Pushkin Museum in Moscow, but sold his collection in 1886 to the Hermitage.
Sergei Mikhailovich (1774–1859), director of the Golitsyn Hospital (1807–59), member of the State Council (1837–59) was married to Avdotya Ivanovna Golitsyna ("princesse Nocturne") the hostess of the St. Petersburg Salon. As he died without issue the inheritance went to his nephew, the bibliophile, who died the year after.

19th and 20th century

 Prince Alexei Vasilyevich Golitsyn (1832–1901) was a friend of Pyotr Ilyich Tchaikovsky. Like the composer, Golitsyn was homosexual; but unlike the composer, he lived openly with his lover, Nikolay Vasilyevich Masalitinov (d. 1884).

 Boris D. Golitsyn (1819-1878) and his son Dmitry B. Golitsyn (1851-1920)
 Prince Grigory Sergeyevich Golitsyn (1838–1907) was a general and the Governor of Transcaucasia in 1897–1904.
 Lev Golitsyn (1845–1915) was one of the founders of winemaking at Yusupov Palace (Crimea). In his estate of Novyi Svet he built the first Russian factory of champagne wines.  In 1889 the production of this winery won the gold medal at the Paris exhibition in the nomination for sparkling wines.  He became the surveyor of imperial vineyards at Abrau-Dyurso in 1891. 
 Nikolai Dmitriyevich Golitsyn (1850–1925) was the son of Dmitry Borisovich Golitsyn (1803–1864) and governor of Archangel, Kaluga, and Tver. He became the last Tsarist prime minister of Russia. On   a hesitating Golitsyn was appointed as  successor of Alexander Trepov. Golitsyn begged the Emperor to cancel his appointment, citing his lack of preparation for the role of Prime Minister. The tsar refused. A few weeks later the February Revolution began. On 26 February Golitsyn used a (signed, but not yet dated) ukaze declaring that his Majesty had decided to interrupt the Imperial Duma until April, leaving it with no legal authority to act. The Government was paralyzed. "On the evening of 27 February (March 12 (N.S.) the Council of Ministers of Russia held its last meeting in the Marinsky Palace and formally submitted its resignation to the Tsar. The Provisional Committee of the State Duma ordered the arrest of all the ex-ministers and senior officials" The next day Golitsyn was transferred to the Peter and Paul Fortress for interrogation. During the period from 1920 to 1924 he was twice arrested by the OGPU, on the suspicion of connection with counterrevolutionaries. After his third arrest (on 12 February 1925), he was executed on 2 July 1925 in Leningrad on the charge of participating in a "counter-revolutionary monarchist organization"
 Princess Sophie Galitzine (1858–1883) who married French aristocrat Paul d'Albert de Luynes, Duke of Chaulnes and was the mother of Emmanuel d'Albert de Luynes, Duke of Chaulnes and Picquigny and Marie Thérèse, Duchess of Uzès.
 Anna Nikolaevna Golitsyna (1859–1929) married Mikhail Rodzianko, chairman of the Imperial Duma. She, Zinaida Yusupova, and Elizabeth Feodorovna secretly supported Felix Yusupov, Grand Duke Dmitry Pavlovich of Russia and Vladimir Purishkevich in the murder of Grigory Rasputin. Rodzianko became one of the key politicians during the Russian February Revolution. He was unacceptable as prime minister and Prince Georgi Lvov, a member of the Constitutional Democratic Party, became his successor.
 Boris Borisovich Golitsyn (1862–1916) was a prominent physicist who invented the first electromagnetic seismograph in 1906.
 Mstislav Galitzine (1899-1966) was married to the famous California mystic, author and heiress Aimee Crocker.
 Vladimir Golitsyn (1902–1943) After an early career as a sailor, during the 1920s Vladimir began a very successful career as a book illustrator and well-known artist, illustrating around forty books between 1925 and 1941. He also worked for the magazines the Universal Pathfinder, Pioneer and several others. Despite his very popular artwork, he was barely tolerated by the Stalinist bureaucracy and as general conditions worsened, found it increasingly hard to support his parents and young family. According to his brother, the writer Sergei Golitsyn, Vladimir died from exhaustion and under-nourishment in the Sviyazhska prison camp on 6 February 1943.
 Prince Leo Golitsyn (b. 1905–), who escaped from Soviet Russia during World War I and came to settle in Canada by 1929 in Edson, Alberta. He and his wife, an Egyptian Princess, purchased 420 acres of land, mostly bordering the McLeod River. Golitsyn and his wife started an airplane charter company at Bear Lake. After the Princess died during a vacation in Europe, Leo moved to Hollywood where he was seen acting in various films as an extra, including in The Razor's Edge and The Chocolate Soldier.
 Sergei Golitsyn was the son of  Mikhail Vladimirovich Golitsyn (1873–1942), and published his Memoirs of a Survivor: The Golitsyn Family in Stalin's Russia, covering the period from the revolution in 1917 to the entry of the Soviet Union into World War II in 1941.
 Nikolai Vladimirovich (1874–1942)
 Yuri Golitsyn (1919–2002), was born in Yokohama, and was one of the founders of public relations having written the handbook on the subject and pushed research on the family forward to being published in a book. He was also a member of The Right Society and yet championed action against concentration camps after being the first allied officer to witness one firsthand (Natzweiler)
 Princess Irene Galitzine (1916–2006), fashion designer, was the daughter of Boris Galizin (1878–1958)

 George Vladimirovich Galitzine (1916–1992) in whose memory The Prince George Galitzine Memorial Library was founded in 1994 by his widow, Princess George Galitzine (formerly Jean Dawnay), and his daughter Princess Catherine (Katya) Galitzine. Prince George served with distinction in the rank of Major, Welsh Guards 1939–45. He was subsequently a diplomat and businessman. Following retirement he was active as a researcher, author and lecturer on Russia.  The Prince George Galitzine Library specialises in the cultural life of St Petersburg with a collection in excess of 3000 books, photographs and documents for research tracing back to Catherine the Great. The Library occupies the palace on the Fontanka, formerly the family home of his mother Countess Catherine Carlow, daughter of  Duke George of Mecklenburg-Strelitz a younger son of Ekaterina Mikhailovna Romanov, Grand Duchess of Russia. Through the Mecklenburg-Strelitz connection, this branch of the Galitzine family are related to many of the Royal Houses of Europe.
 George Golitzin (1916–1963), Hollywood producer and deacon in the Orthodox Church in America.
 Georgy Sergeyevich Golitsyn (b. 1935), Russian physicist noted for his research on the concept of nuclear winter.
  (1942–2018), Russian-Serbian-American banker with Bank of New York who led the re-introduction of banks in the former Warsaw Pact countries including the newly formed states from the former Soviet Union.
 Bishop Alexander (Golitzin) (b. 1948), is Archbishop for Dallas, the South and the Bulgarian Diocese for the Orthodox Church in America. He is also emeritus professor of theology at Marquette University in Milwaukee, Wisconsin, USA. His academic work focuses on the discerning the roots of eastern Christian spirituality in Second Temple Judaism.
 Alexander Golitzen (1908–2005) was a Moscow-born production designer and oversaw art direction on more than 300 movies; he died in San Diego, California.
 Anatoliy Golitsyn (1926–2008) was a Soviet defector to the United States
 Maria-Anna Galitzine (b. 1954), wife of Prince Peter Galitzine, Catholic activist
 Grigori Galitsin (1957–2021) was a former erotic photographer.
 Tatiana Galitzine (b. 1984) is an American architect and the daughter Prince Peter Galitzine.
 Maria Galitzine (1988–2020) was a Russian-American interior designer and the daughter of Prince Peter Galitzine.
 Nicholas Galitzine (b. 1994), son of  Prince Geoffrey Galitzine and Lora (née Papayanni), an actor and musician, was born in London and has starred in films such as High Strung (2016), Handsome Devil (2016), Cinderella (2021) and  Purple Hearts (2022)

Notes

References

Bibliography
 

 Golitsyn, Sergei (1909–1989): Memoirs of a Survivor: The Golitsyn Family in Stalin's Russia, 2008 
 Le Donne John P. (1987) Ruling families in the Russian political order, 1689–1825 : I. The Petrine leadership, 1689–1725; II. The ruling families, 1725–1825. In: Cahiers du monde russe et soviétique, vol. 28, n°3-4, Juillet-Décembre 1987. pp. 233–322. 
 Douglas Smith: Former People: The Final Days of the Russian Aristocracy. Farrar, Straus and Giroux, 2012

External links

Site of Princess Irene Golitsyn
Golitsyn Museum in Moscow
 The Great Russian Encyclopedia (BDE): Golitsyns – Russian princely family

 
Russian noble families